

Iytwelepenty / Davenport Range, or Davenport Ranges National Park (Iytwellepenty), previously the Davenport Murchison National Park, is a national park in the Northern Territory of Australia about  south-east of the territorial capital of Darwin, occupying around s of the Davenport Range.

The mountains were caused by a tectonic event hundreds of millions of years ago, but recent images from space have shown that erosion occurred that exposed the ridges and valleys only around 100 million years ago. Amelia Creek crater, an ancient eroded impact crater lies within the Davenport Range in the area.

See also 
 Protected areas of the Northern Territory

Gallery

References

External links
 Official fact sheet and map

National parks of the Northern Territory
Protected areas established in 1993
1993 establishments in Australia